Brandon Pérez (born 14 January 2000) is a Venezuelan tennis player.

Pérez has a career high ATP singles ranking of 1662, achieved on 3 February 2020. He also has a career high ATP doubles ranking of 827, achieved on 6 May 2019.

Pérez represents Venezuela at the Davis Cup, where he has a W/L record of 0–3.

Pérez currently plays college tennis at the University of Nebraska. He had also previously played for Virginia Tech.

References

External links

Brandon Pérez at the University of Nebraska
Brandon Pérez at Virginia Tech

2000 births
Living people
Venezuelan male tennis players
Sportspeople from Durham, North Carolina
Tennis players from Caracas
Nebraska Cornhuskers men's tennis players
21st-century Venezuelan people